Conley may refer to:

Surname 
Conley, an Irish surname

Buildings, bridges, and roads

 Conley-Maass-Downs Building, a commercial building in Rochester, MN, listed on the NRHP in Minnesota
 Conley's Ford Covered Bridge, Parke County, IN, listed on the NRHP in Indiana
 Conley Road, a thoroughfare in southeast Atlanta, GA
 Conley-Greene Rockshelter, a prehistoric site in Lytten, KY listed on the NRHP in Kentucky

Case law
 Conley v. Gibson, a case decided by the Supreme Court of the United States (1957)

Places
 Conley, Georgia, a town in the United States
 Conley Township, Holt County, Nebraska

Schools
 Conley-Caraballo High School
 J. Michael Conley Elementary School at Southwood

Others
 Conleyus, a genus of crabs, named after the collector Harry T. Conley